is a railway station on the two lines of Osaka Metro in Ikutamamaemachi, Tennōji-ku, Osaka, Japan. Nicknamed "", the station connects with Osaka Uehommachi Station on the Kintetsu lines.

Lines

Osaka Metro
 (T25)
 (S18)
Kintetsu (Osaka Uehommachi Station)
Osaka Line (D03)
Namba Line, Nara Line (A03)

Service pattern
The typical hourly off-peak service from this station is as follows.

Tanimachi Line
10 northbound trains (every 6 minutes) to Dainichi
10 southbound trains (every 6 minutes) to Yaominami

Sennichimae Line
8 westbound trains (every 7.5 minutes) to Nodahanshin
8 eastbound trains (every 7.5 minutes) to Minami-Tatsumi

Station layout
The station consists of two side platforms serving two tracks for the Tanimachi Line on the first basement, and an island platform serving two tracks for the Sennichimae Line on the second basement.

Platforms

Tanimachi Line

Sennichimae Line

History

The station opened on December 17, 1968 as a stop on Line 2. It became an interchange station on July 25, 1969 when it became the terminus of the section of Line 5 between here and Imazato. Later that year, on December 6, Lines 2 and 5 were named the Tanimachi and Sennichimae Lines respectively. On March 11, 1970, the section of the Sennichimae Line between here and Sakuragawa opened, allowing trains to run to Nodahanshin.

Surrounding area
 Ikukunitama Shrine
 Kozugu
 International House, Osaka
 Seifu Junior/Senior High School
 Uenomiya Junior/Senior High School
 Meisei Junior/Senior High School
 Uehommachi Hi-Hi Town
 Kintetsu Group Headquarters
 Kintetsu Department Store Uehommachi
 Sheraton Miyako Hotel Osaka

Buses
Tanimachi Kyuchome (Osaka City Bus)
Route 73 for Deto Bus Terminal via Uehommachi Rokuchome and Katsuyama Sanchome / for Namba
Uehommachi Rokuchome (Osaka City Bus)
see Osaka Uehommachi Station

External links 

 Official Site - Tanimachi Line 
 Official Site - Tanimachi Line 
 Official Site - Sennichimae Line 
 Official Site - Sennichimae Line

References

Railway stations in Osaka Prefecture
Railway stations in Japan opened in 1968
Osaka Metro stations